Soul: Original Motion Picture Soundtrack is the soundtrack to the 2020 Disney-Pixar film Soul. The soundtrack is a compilation of all 23 score pieces by Trent Reznor and Atticus Ross from the Soul: Original Motion Picture Score vinyl album as well as 16 original songs by Jon Batiste from the Music from and Inspired by Soul vinyl album. All three albums were released through Walt Disney Records on December 18, 2020.

Reznor and Ross composed a new-age score for the metaphysical segments of the film, while Batiste composed a number of original jazz songs for the New York City-based segments of the film. The soundtrack received critical acclaim as an integral part of the film and won both the Golden Globe and the Oscar for Best Original Score.

Writing and recording 

During the 2019 D23 Expo, Trent Reznor and Atticus Ross were revealed to be composing the film's score, while Jon Batiste was set to be writing jazz songs for the film. Reznor and Ross had been brought in on the recommendation of sound designer Ren Klyce, who had worked extensively with the duo in David Fincher films. Batiste composed jazz music for the film's New York City sequences while Reznor and Ross wrote an instrumental score for the scenes taking place in the Great Before. Batiste said that he wanted to create jazz music that felt "authentic", but also "accessible to all ages". He also wanted the themes to tie into the "ethereal nature" of the Great Before while still being on Earth. Batiste also sometimes worked with Reznor and Ross to "blend the two worlds, musically". Cody Chesnutt also wrote, produced, and performed an original folk-soul ballad for the film, titled "Parting Ways". It also features a hip hop interlude performed by Daveed Diggs titled "Rappin Ced". Other musicians who were consulted during the creative process include Herbie Hancock, Terri Lyne Carrington and Questlove, the latter of whom also does voice work in the film. Batiste drew inspiration from and wanted to pay homage to jazz legends such as Roy Haynes, Harvey Mason, Branford Marsalis, Kenny Kirkland, Charlie Parker and The Headhunters. Batiste also arranged a new version of the song "It's All Right", originally performed by The Impressions, for the film. This solo version debuted during a performance by Nelly on the 29th season of American competition TV series Dancing with the Stars and is featured in the end credits of the film while a duet version with British soul singer Celeste is not included in the soundtrack. In January 2021, Trent Reznor revealed to Consequence of Sound that he and Atticus Ross had composed six films' worth of music for Soul and also further explained his creative process, stating:

Release and promotion 
Soul: Original Motion Picture Soundtrack was released digitally on December 18, 2020, a week before that of the film. The two vinyl albums, namely Soul: Original Motion Picture Score by Trent Reznor and Atticus Ross and Music from and Inspired by Soul by Jon Batiste, were also made available for purchase on December 18, 2020. Despite not featuring on any of the three albums, the duet version of "It's All Right" with Celeste that features during the end credits was also released digitally as a standalone single on December 18.

Reception

Critical response 
The soundtrack received a positive response from both music critics and film critics alike. Many film reviews praised the score as a major highlight of the film. Leslie Felperin of The Hollywood Reporter wrote, "Featuring possibly the best soundtrack in a Pixar film since the first Toy Story, Soul sports a jazz score that is not just an adornment to the story or an emotional enhancement, but an utterly integral part of the narrative." Reznor and Ross's compositions during the metaphysical segments of the film was described musically as new-age and space age, while Batiste's work was described musically as jazz. In a film review for The A.V. Club, A.A. Dowd described the score as "uncharacteristically soothing", while Matt Goldberg of Collider described it as "spellbinding", and A .O. Scott of The New York Times described it as "cerebral".

Accolades

Commercial performance 
A week before the release of the film, the soundtrack album debuted on the UK Soundtrack Albums chart at number 35. After the film was released on December 25, the soundtrack rose to number 12 on this chart and also was credited as two separated entries, one for score and one for soundtrack, on both Billboard's Soundtrack Albums chart and Current Album Sales chart.

Track listing 
All songs are written and performed by Trent Reznor and Atticus Ross, except where noted.

Charts

Notes

References 

2020 soundtrack albums
Jazz soundtracks
Pixar soundtracks
New-age soundtracks
Walt Disney Records soundtracks
Atticus Ross soundtracks
Trent Reznor soundtracks
2020s film soundtrack albums
Jon Batiste albums
Scores that won the Best Original Score Academy Award